"Saint Laurent" is a song by producers DJ Sliink and Skrillex, and rapper Wale. It was released on August 3, 2017, via Owsla.

Background 
The song was described as a high-energy club-ready banger by XXL. It was released on Skrillex's Owsla label. The cover art, which is minimal and dark, was revealed on Reddit. Skrillex was quoted talking about the collaboration:

References 

Skrillex songs
Hip hop songs
Wale (rapper) songs
2017 songs
2017 singles
Electronic dance music songs
Owsla singles